The Douglas Dolphin is an American amphibious flying boat. While only 58 were built, they served a wide variety of roles including private air yacht, airliner, military transport, and search and rescue.

Design and development
The Dolphin originated in 1930 as the "Sinbad," a pure flying boat without wheels. The Sinbad was intended as a luxurious flying yacht. Undaunted by the lack of demand, Douglas improved the Sinbad in 1931 so that it was amphibious, and could land on water or land. The improved aircraft was named "Dolphin", however this did not represent the end of development, as many detail improvements were made, including an increase in the length of over a foot and changes made to the empennage, engine nacelles and wings. The Great Depression had curtailed demand for such extravagance as a "flying yacht", but Douglas managed to interest the United States Coast Guard who not only bought the Sinbad, but 12 Dolphins.

Operational history

The first two were purchased by Wilmington-Catalina Airlines to fly passengers between Los Angeles and Santa Catalina Island, becoming the first successful Douglas airliners. Subsequent examples were ordered by the United States Navy and U.S. Coast Guard for use as transports and search and rescue craft.  The U.S. Army Air Corps ordered several under the designations C-21, C-26, and C-29. Many were eventually ordered for their original purpose as luxury transports. Owners included William Boeing, the founder of the Boeing Company, and Philip K. Wrigley, the son of the founder of the Wm. Wrigley Jr. Company. William K. Vanderbilt bought two with custom interiors for use from the Vanderbilt yacht Alva as flying tenders.

One was procured by the U.S. Navy as a transport for President Franklin D. Roosevelt. Although never used by Roosevelt, this was the first aircraft procured to provide transportation for the President of the United States.

In 1933, landing in heavy seas, the USCG RD-4 undertook some rescues of merchant sailors at sea, feats that made spectacular news reports, enthralling the American public.

Variants

Data from:McDonnell Douglas Aircraft since 1920 Vol.1
Douglas Sinbad
The original prototype built as a flying boat, intended to be a luxurious flying yacht, first flown in July 1930. No orders were received for the Sinbad which was eventually bought by the U.S. Coast Guard.
Dolphin Model 1
 The initial two Dolphins built for the Wilmington-Catalina Airline Ltd. as six-seat airliners.
Dolphin Model 1 Special
The Model 1s redesignated after modification to seat eight passengers.
Dolphin Model 3
The third commercial Dolphin built as a luxury transport named Lesgo with seats for two crew and four passengers for Powel Crosley Jr., powered by 2x  Pratt & Whitney Wasp Junior A engines. Later impressed into the RAAF as A35-3.
Dolphin 113
One aircraft named Jade Blanc V for French clothing manufacturer Armand Esders (who also owned a Bugatti Royale) similar to the RD-4, powered by 2x  Pratt & Whitney R-1340-S1H1 Wasp engines.
Dolphin 114
A single Dolphin built to order for Philip K. Wrigley, powered by 2x  Pratt & Whitney Wasp SC1 engines.
Dolphin 116
One aircraft for the Armada Argentina (Argentine Navy), powered by 2x  P&W R-1340-96.
Dolphin 117
One aircraft initially named Rover, bought by William E. Boeing, which ended up in CAA (forerunner of the current Federal Aviation Administration) service. Sole surviving example, painted in USCG markings.
Dolphin 119
Two aircraft built for Alfred Gwynne Vanderbilt Jr. and William Kissam Vanderbilt II and operated from the yacht Alva. One of the two (which is unknown) joined the RAAF as A35-2.
Dolphin 129
Two aircraft ordered by Pan American Airways for its subsidiary (at that time) China National Aviation Corporation, powered by 2x  Pratt & Whitney Wasp S3D1 engines. One crashed in heavy seas and the other was destroyed during or shortly after the Japanese invasion of China.
Dolphin 136
A single Dolphin, powered by 2x  Pratt & Whitney Wasp Junior SB engines, ordered by Standard Oil and later impressed by the RAAF as A35-1.
FP-1
Several C-21 aircraft loaned to the U.S. Treasury Department for border patrols during Prohibition.
FP-2
The two Y1C-26 Dolphins during a brief attachment to the U.S. Treasury Department.
FP-2A
The designation used by those Y1C-26A aircraft that were attached to the U.S. Treasury Department.
FP-2B
The two C-29s when in use by the U.S. Treasury Department.
RD-1
One aircraft, powered by 2x  Wright R-975E radial engines, operated by the U.S. Navy.
RD-2
Four Dolphin aircraft of two distinct types. One Aircraft similar to the Y1C-21 and powered by 2x  Pratt & Whitney R-1340-10 engines, for the U.S. Coast Guard. Two were U.S. Navy VIP staff transports similar to the Y1C-26 powered by 2x  Pratt & Whitney R-1340-96 engines. The final aircraft was completed for the U.S. Navy  as the first presidential aircraft, for Franklin D. Roosevelt, powered initially by 2x  Pratt & Whitney R-1340-1 engines and later by 2x  Pratt & Whitney R-1340-10 engines, seating five though it was reportedly never used by the President.
RD-3
A utility transport version of the RD-2, six of which were built for the U.S. Navy, powered by 2x  Pratt & Whitney R-1340-4 or by 2x  Pratt & Whitney R-1340-96 engines.
RD-4
Ten aircraft for the U.S. Coast Guard, powered by 2x  Pratt & Whitney Wasp C1 engines. One, V-126, was destroyed on the morning of August 5th, 1941, when it likely struck a rock pinnacle on the southeastmost of the Farallon Islands near San Francisco, causing the aircraft to burst into flames. All 3 crewmen aboard were killed. 
OA-3
C-21 aircraft redesignated.
OA-4
C-26 aircraft redesignated.
OA-4A
Y1C-26A aircraft redesignated.
OA-4B
C-26B aircraft redesignated, one of which was fitted with an experimental fixed tricycle undercarriage.
OA-4C
Four OA-4A and one OA-4B aircraft modernized in 1936.
Y1C-21
Eight aircraft for the USAAS, similar to the Navy's RD-1, powered by 2x  Wright R-975-3 engines.
Y1C-26
Two aircraft for the USAAS with increased dimensions, fin area and fuel capacity (from to ). Powered by 2x  Pratt & Whitney R-985-1 engines. 
Y1C-26A
Eight aircraft for the USAAS differing from the Y1C-26 only in minor details.
C-21
Y1C-21 aircraft redesignated.
C-26
Y1C-26 aircraft redesignated.
C-26A
Y1C-26A aircraft redesignated.
C-26B
Four aircraft powered by 2x  Pratt & Whitney R-985-9 engines.
C-29
Two Dolphins, powered by 2x  Pratt & Whitney R-1340-29 engines, were essentially similar to the Y1C-26As.

Military operators

 
Argentine Naval Aviation
 
Royal Australian Air Force
 
U.S. Army Air Corps
U.S. Army Air Force
United States Coast Guard
U.S. Marine Corps
United States Navy

Specifications (RD-3 Dolphin)

See also

References

Notes

Bibliography

 Bowers, Peter M. "Douglas Dolphin." Airpower, Volume 12, Number 6, November 1982.
 Francillon, René J. McDonnell Douglas Aircraft since 1920, Volume 1. London: Putnam & Company Ltd., Second revised edition, 1988, 1979. .

External links

Dolphin
Flying boats
1930s United States civil utility aircraft
1930s United States military transport aircraft
Amphibious aircraft
High-wing aircraft
Aircraft first flown in 1930
Twin piston-engined tractor aircraft